Gustavo Albella (August 25, 1925 in Alta Gracia, Argentina – 13 June 2000) was an Argentine footballer who played for clubs in Argentina, Brazil and Chile.

Albella remains as the all-time top scorer for Banfield, with 136 goals (71 in Primera División and 65 in Primera B).

Career 
Albella started playing at Sportivo Alta Gracia in his hometown. He also played in other clubs of the city such as 25 de Mayo and Club Colón. In 1943 he moved to Buenos Aires to play for Talleres de Remedios de Escalada, then playing in the second division, Primera B Metropolitana. After a good performance in a friendly v Boca Juniors, the club acquired Albella as substitute player of Jaime Sarlanga. In Talleres (where he was an idol for the institution), Albella played a total of 36 official matches, scoring 29 goals.

Albella played for Boca Juniors during the 1945 season, alternating between the senior squad and the reserve team. When Sarlanga was injured, Albella replaced him as centre forward, scoring 6 goals. At the same time, he was completing the military service, where a lieutenant who was linked to C.A. Banfield, offered him to play for the club.

In Banfield, Albella debuted in the Primera B tournament, in 1946. The squad won the championship with 14 points ahead Gimnasia y Esgrima La Plata, which finished 2nd. Banfield set also a record of 28 matches unbeaten (achieved during the first 28 rounds). Albella remained in Banfield until 1951, when he was traded to Brazilian São Paulo FC. During his tenure on the club, he switched from forward to midfielder, winning the 1953 Campeonato Paulista.

In 1955 Albella returned to Banfield, playing one season before moving to Chile to play for Green Cross, winning the 1960 Segunda División title before retiring from football.

During his two tenures on Banfield, Albella totalised 136 goals for C.A. Banfield, becoming the all-time top scorer of the club.

Titles 
Banfield
 Primera B Metropolitana (1): 1946
São Paulo
 Campeonato Paulista (1): 1953 
Green Cross
 Segunda División (1): 1960

Honours
 Green Cross 1957 and 1958 (Top Scorer Chilean Championship)

References

External links
 

1925 births
2000 deaths
Argentine expatriate footballers
Argentine footballers
Chilean Primera División players
Club Atlético Banfield footballers
São Paulo FC players
Club de Deportes Green Cross footballers
Boca Juniors footballers
Expatriate footballers in Chile
Expatriate footballers in Brazil
Association football forwards
Sportspeople from Córdoba Province, Argentina